Superdude or Super Dude may refer to:

Super Dude, 1973 album by Don Covay
 Hangup, 1974 film also released under the title Super Dude 
A hamster referred to in 1995 The Simpsons television episode Who Shot Mr. Burns?
Superdude (TV series) an Indian reality show that ran for two seasons ending in 2012
KTM 1290 Super Duke R, a motorcycle built by manufacturer KTM - sometimes referred to as "Super Dude"